Ribosome-releasing factor 2, mitochondrial is a protein that in humans is encoded by the GFM2 gene.
 Unlike the other EF-G homolog GFM1, GFM2 functions as a Ribosome Recycling Factor in termination.

References

External links